Karnataka Rajya Raitha Sangha, also known as KRRS, is a farmer's movement. M. D. Nanjundaswamy was the president of the organisation.

Karnataka Rajya Raitha Sangha's state president is Chamarasa Mali Patil. He is based in Raichur District, present Karnataka Rajya Raitha Sangha State President Badagalapura Nagendra. He is based in Mysore district.

References

Agricultural organisations based in India